François Marc (born 19 March 1950) is a member of the Senate of France, representing the Finistère department. He is a member of the Socialist Party.

References
Page on the Senate website 

1950 births
Living people
French Senators of the Fifth Republic
Socialist Party (France) politicians
Senators of Finistère